Expeditie Robinson 2017 was the eighteenth season of the popular Dutch version of Swedish reality television series Expedition Robinson.

For the first time since 2009, four undiscovered Dutch citizens competed alongside fifteen celebrities. The four started on the Island of the Unknowns and took part in duels to enter the game. Also, after the teams are divided, the person who reached the end last would not be put on a tribe and be sent to the Island of the Unknowns. Also, for the first time in the series' history, a father and daughter (Richard and Joëlle Witschge) competed alongside each other in the season.

The competition was won by Carlos Platier Luna.

Finishing order

Future Appearances
Niels Gomperts and Carlos Platier Luna returned to compete in Expeditie Robinson: All Stars.

References

External links

Expeditie Robinson seasons
2017 Dutch television seasons
Dutch reality television series
2010s reality television series